Romance Road is a 1925 American silent comedy film directed by Fred Windemere and starring Raymond McKee, Billy Bletcher and Margery Meadows.

Plot summary

Cast
 Raymond McKee as Patrick O'Brien
 Billy Bletcher as Patrick's Pal
 Margery Meadows as Mary Van Tassler 
 Dick Gordon as Arthur Waddington Watts
 Gertrude Claire as Ma O'Brien

References

Bibliography
 Munden, Kenneth White. The American Film Institute Catalog of Motion Pictures Produced in the United States, Part 1. University of California Press, 1997.

External links
 
 
 
 

1925 films
1925 comedy films
1920s English-language films
American silent feature films
Silent American comedy films
American black-and-white films
Films directed by Fred Windemere
1920s American films
English-language comedy films